Caeso Fabius Ambustus was a four-time consular tribune of the Roman Republic around the turn of the 5th and 4th centuries BC.

Caeso was quaestor in 409 BC, the first year the office was opened to the plebs, and three of his colleagues were plebeians. Caeso was consular tribune for the first time in 404, again in 401, a third time in 395, and a fourth time in 390.

Caeso was the son of Marcus Fabius Ambustus, the Pontifex Maximus, and brother to Numerius and Quintus. With his two brothers, Caeso was sent as ambassador to the Gauls, when the latter were besieging Clusium, and participated in an attack against the besieging Gauls. The Gauls demanded that the three should be surrendered to them for violating the law of nations.  When the Roman Senate refused to give up the guilty parties, the Gauls marched against Rome, which they sacked after the battle of the Allia.

Many scholars believe the entire story of the events at Clusium to be fiction, as Clusium had no real reason to appeal to Rome for help, and the Gauls needed no real provocation to sack Rome. The story, it is hypothesized, exists to provide an explanation for an otherwise unmotivated attack on Rome, and to depict Rome as a bulwark of Italy against the Gauls.

He was the father of Marcus Fabius Ambustus.

See also
 Ambustus, for other men with the same cognomen
 Fabius Ambustus, for other men who used the same combination of gens name and cognomen
 Fabia gens, for a comprehensive list of gens members

References

5th-century BC Romans
4th-century BC Romans
Roman quaestors
Caeso
Roman consular tribunes